The September 2016 UK Independence Party leadership election was triggered after Nigel Farage, the leader of the UK Independence Party, announced on 4 July 2016, following the Leave result in the UK referendum on EU membership, that he would step down when a new leader had been elected.

As more than one candidate ran for the party leadership, it was the first contested UKIP leadership election since 2010; Farage won the 2014 leadership election unopposed. Diane James won with 8,451 votes. However, just 18 days later, she stepped down as leader and Farage was reinstated as interim leader. A second leadership election was held in November, which was won by Paul Nuttall.

Campaign
Suggested potential candidates at the time of Nigel Farage's resignation included Paul Nuttall, Steven Woolfe, Suzanne Evans, Diane James, Peter Whittle, Douglas Carswell and Patrick O'Flynn, among others. Farage stated he would not endorse any candidate.

Evans was ineligible at the time, because she had been suspended from the party. She declared that she desired her suspension lifted so that she could stand for the leadership. Evans did not, however, at the time pursue an appeal, which is the only means under the party constitution to lift a suspension.

Paul Nuttall announced on 9 July 2016 that he would not stand for the leadership and that he would step down as Deputy Leader of the party.

The party's National Executive Committee (NEC) stated that the position of leader would be advertised online. Anyone wishing to apply would need 50 nominations from party members and would be required to pay a £5,000 fee. There was to be a series of hustings over the summer. Every party member would have a vote, and the winner was to be declared at the party's conference on 15 September.

On 10 July 2016 the NEC decided that eligible candidates had to have been members for at least five years, ruling out several possible nominations including Suzanne Evans, Douglas Carswell and Arron Banks; although the NEC later reduced this requirement to two years' membership, potential candidates previously thought to be ineligible did not stand. Woolfe, however, was reported to have allowed his membership to lapse for a few months (along with previously failing to declare a conviction from 14 years earlier for being drunk while in charge of a scooter (not drink-driving) when he stood for a police and crime commissioner post, in possible breach of electoral law); the NEC was to decide on his eligibility during final vetting procedures. (The NEC later declared him ineligible, not owing to these issues but because he missed the nomination deadline by 17 minutes).

In late July 2016, party chairman Steve Crowther told UKIP Wales Leader Nathan Gill, standing for Deputy Leader on a joint ticket with Woolfe, to stop "double jobbing", i.e. to stand down as an MEP now that he was a member of the Welsh Assembly for North Wales, or instead face having his right to stand for election removed by the party.

At the close of nominations on 31 July 2016, Woolfe missed the deadline for submitting his application by 17 minutes, owing to technical problems; on 3 August, the NEC ruled that this made him ineligible to stand. Three members of the NEC subsequently resigned in protest. The vote was seen in the context of a tension within the party between Farage supporters, backing Woolfe, and the more centrist Evans/Carswell wing.

Two candidates emerged in August only upon the finalisation of candidates: Phillip Broughton, a former parliamentary candidate for Hartlepool; and Diane James, MEP for South East England. Jonathan Arnott later withdrew midway through the contest on 15 August 2016, saying he thought he could only come second and that he was not prepared to "court controversy in order to gain column inches" to be elected Leader.

James was criticised for not attending any hustings events.

Bill Etheridge
His policy proposals included cheaper beer, better representation for fathers in the family court system and a referendum on bringing back the death penalty. Also amongst his policy proposals were prison reform and a move to save the British public house by reintroducing smoking via the use of efficient extraction systems as used within the European Parliament itself. While in favour of Muslim faith schools and same-sex marriage, he advocates banning the Burka.

Lisa Duffy
On 8 August she made a speech calling for a shutdown of Muslim schools and Sharia courts and a ban on Islamic full-face veils in public spaces. The remarks were compared to those of Donald Trump. Duffy denied "chasing the bigot vote".

Candidates

Declared
 Phillip Broughton, UKIP candidate for Hartlepool in 2015
 Lisa Duffy, Town and District Councillor for Ramsey; Chief of Staff for Patrick O'Flynn (standing on joint ticket with O'Flynn as Deputy Leader)
 Bill Etheridge, MEP for the West Midlands and Dudley Borough Councillor for Sedgley Ward (standing on joint ticket with Mike Hookem as Deputy Leader)
 Diane James, Co-Deputy Chair of UKIP since 2016; MEP for South East England
 Elizabeth Jones, UKIP NEC Member; UKIP Lambeth Deputy Chair (standing on joint ticket with Lawrence Webb as Deputy Leader)

Withdrew
 Jonathan Arnott, MEP for North East England (had been standing on joint ticket with Louise Bours as Deputy Leader)

Ineligible
The following people, whether they declared their candidacies or were considered potential candidates, were declared ineligible for various reasons:
 Douglas Carswell, MP for Clacton (had been a party member for less than two years; declined)
 Suzanne Evans, Co-Deputy Chair of UKIP from 2014 to 2016 (suspended from UKIP on 23 March 2016)
 Raheem Kassam, Editor of Breitbart London; former senior adviser to Nigel Farage (had been a party member for less than two years; endorsed Steven Woolfe)
 Mark Reckless, UKIP Economics Spokesman; Member of the Welsh Assembly for South Wales East; former MP for Rochester and Strood (had been a party member for less than two years)
 Steven Woolfe, UKIP Migration Spokesman; MEP for North West England (missed nomination deadline by 17 minutes; had been to stand on joint ticket with Nathan Gill as Deputy Leader)

Declined
The following individuals either declined to stand or were potential candidates who did not stand by the close of nominations:
 Tim Aker, MEP for the East of England
 David Coburn, MEP for Scotland; Leader of UKIP in Scotland
 Neil Hamilton, Leader of UKIP in the Welsh Assembly; Member of the Welsh Assembly for Mid and West Wales; Co-Deputy Chair of UKIP from 2014 to 2016
 David Kurten, London-wide Member of the London Assembly (endorsed Steven Woolfe)
 Paul Nuttall, Deputy Leader of UKIP; MEP for North West England
 Patrick O'Flynn, MEP for the East of England
 Margot Parker, UKIP Small Business Spokesperson; MEP for the East Midlands
 Peter Whittle, Leader of UKIP in the London Assembly and London-wide Member of the London Assembly (endorsed Steven Woolfe)

Endorsements

Lisa Duffy
MEPs
 Patrick O'Flynn, MEP for the East of England (stood for Deputy Leader, on joint ticket with Duffy)
 Gerard Batten, MEP for London, founding member of UKIP
 Louise Bours, MEP for North West England
Other people
 Suzanne Evans, Co-Deputy Chair of UKIP from 2014 to 2016

Bill Etheridge
MEPs
 Mike Hookem, MEP for Yorkshire and the Humber and UKIP Defence Spokesperson (stood for Deputy Leader, on joint ticket with Etheridge)

Diane James
Other people
 Arron Banks, businessman; co-founder of the Leave.EU campaign; prominent UKIP donor (previously endorsed Steven Woolfe)

Organisations
 Leave.EU (previously endorsed Steven Woolfe)

Elizabeth Jones
Other people
 Lawrence Webb, UKIP candidate for Mayor of London in 2012 (stood for Deputy Leader, on joint ticket with Jones)

Previous endorsements

Jonathan Arnott
MEPs
 Louise Bours, MEP for North West England
 James Carver, MEP for the West Midlands
 Jane Collins, MEP for Yorkshire and the Humber and UKIP Employment Spokesperson
 Julia Reid, MEP for South West England
Other people
 Michelle Brown, Member of the Welsh Assembly for North Wales
 David McNarry, Leader of UKIP in Northern Ireland; former Member of the Northern Ireland Assembly for Strangford
 Jeffrey Titford, former Leader of UKIP (2000–2002; 2010); former MEP for the East of England
 John Whittaker, former Chairman of the UK Independence Party (2006–2008); former MEP for North West England

Steven Woolfe
MPs and MEPs
 Tim Aker, MEP for the East of England
 David Coburn, MEP for Scotland; Leader of UKIP in Scotland
 William Dartmouth, MEP for South West England; Co-Deputy Chair of UKIP since 2016
 Nathan Gill, MEP for Wales; Leader of UKIP Wales (was to stand on joint ticket with Woolfe, for Deputy Leader; campaign chair)
 Jill Seymour, MEP for the West Midlands
Other people
 Arron Banks, businessman; co-founder of the Leave.EU campaign; prominent UKIP donor
 Raheem Kassam, Editor of Breitbart London
 David Kurten, London-wide Member of the London Assembly
 Peter Whittle, Leader of UKIP in the London Assembly and London-wide Member of the London Assembly (deputy campaign chair)

Organisations
 Leave.EU

Timetable
Nominations opened on 11 July 2016 and closed on 31 July. Campaigning took place in August, with a series of hustings taking place, before ballot papers were issued on 1 September to every party member, with the winner declared at the party's conference on 15 September. On 16 September, Diane James was elected leader of the party.

On 4 October 2016, 18 days after being elected, James resigned the party leadership, precipitating another election. Nigel Farage became interim leader.

Results

Diane James was elected Leader with 46% of the vote. However, 18 days later she resigned the leadership, leading to the November 2016 leadership election.

See also
 2016 Conservative Party leadership election
 2016 Green Party of England and Wales leadership election
 2016 Labour Party leadership election (UK)

References

Consequences of the 2016 United Kingdom European Union membership referendum
2016 in British politics
2016
September 2016 events in the United Kingdom
UK Independence Party leadership election